The Double Irish arrangement was a base erosion and profit shifting (BEPS) corporate tax avoidance tool used mostly by United States multinationals since the late 1980s to avoid corporate taxation on non-U.S. profits. (The US was one of a small number of countries that did not use a "territorial" tax system, and taxed corporations on all profits, no matter whether the profit was made outside the US or not, in contrast to "territorial" tax systems which tax only profits made within that country.) It was the largest tax avoidance tool in history and by 2010 was shielding US$100 billion annually in US multinational foreign profits from taxation, and was the main tool by which US multinationals built up untaxed offshore reserves of US$1 trillion from 2004 to 2018.  Traditionally, it was also used with the Dutch Sandwich BEPS tool; however, 2010 changes to tax laws in Ireland dispensed with this requirement.

Despite US knowledge of the Double Irish for a decade, it was the European Commission that in October 2014 forced Ireland to close the scheme, starting in January 2015. However, users of existing schemes, such as Apple, Google, Facebook and Pfizer, were given until January 2020 to close them. At the announcement of the closure it was known that multinationals had replacement BEPS tools in Ireland, the Single Malt (2014), and Capital Allowances for Intangible Assets (CAIA) (2009):

US tax academics showed as long ago as 1994 that US multinational use of tax havens and BEPS tools had maximised long-term US exchequer receipts. They showed that multinationals from "territorial" tax systems, which all but a handful of countries follow, did not use BEPS tools, or tax havens, including those that had recently switched, such as Japan (2009), and the UK (2009–12). By 2018, tax academics showed US multinationals were the largest users of BEPS tools and Ireland was the largest global BEPS hub or tax haven. They showed that US multinationals represented the largest component of the Irish economy and that Ireland had failed to attract multinationals from "territorial" tax systems.

The US switch to a "territorial" tax system in the December 2017 Tax Cuts and Jobs Act ("TCJA"), and caused US tax academics to forecast the demise of Irish BEPS tools and Ireland as a US corporate tax haven. However, by mid-2018, other tax academics, including the IMF, noted that technical flaws in the TCJA had increased the attractiveness of Ireland's BEPS tools, and the CAIA BEPS tool in particular, which post-TCJA, delivered a total effective tax rate ("ETR") of 0–2.5% on profits that can be fully repatriated to the US without incurring any additional US taxation.  In July 2018, one of Ireland's leading tax economists forecasted a "boom" in the use of the Irish CAIA BEPS tool as US multinationals close existing Double Irish BEPS schemes before the 2020 deadline.

Double Irish

Concept and origin (1991)

The Double Irish is an IP–based BEPS tool. Under OECD rules, corporations with intellectual property ("IP"), which are mostly technology and life sciences firms, can turn this into an intangible asset ("IA") on their balance sheet, and charge it out as a tax-deductible royalty payment to end-customers.  Without such IP, if Microsoft charged a German end-customer $100, for Microsoft Office, a profit of circa $95 (as the cost to Microsoft for copies of Microsoft Office is small) would be realised in Germany, and German tax would be payable on this profit. However, if Germany allows such an intangible asset, Microsoft can additionally charge Microsoft Germany $95 in IP royalty payments on each copy of Microsoft Office, reducing its German profits to zero. The $95 is paid to the entity in which the IP is legally housed. Microsoft would prefer to house this IP in a tax haven; however, higher-tax locations like Germany do not sign full tax treaties with tax havens, and would not accept the IP charged from a tax haven as deductible against German taxation. The Double Irish fixes this problem.

The Double Irish enables the IP to be charged-out from Ireland, which has a large global network of full bilateral tax treaties. The Double Irish enables the hypothetical $95, which was sent from Germany to Ireland, to be sent on to a tax haven such as Bermuda without incurring any Irish taxation. The techniques of using IP to relocate profits from higher-tax locations to low-tax locations are called base erosion and profit shifting ("BEPS") tools. There are many types of BEPS tools (e.g. Debt–based BEPS tools); however, IP–based BEPS tool are the largest group.

As with all Irish BEPS tools, the Irish subsidiary must conduct a "relevant trade" on the IP in Ireland.  A "business plan" must be produced with Irish employment and salary levels that are acceptable to the Irish State during the period the BEPS tool is in operation.  Despite these requirements, the effective tax rate ("ETR") of the Double Irish is almost 0%, as the EU Commission discovered with Apple in 2016.

Most major U.S. technology and life sciences multinationals have been identified as using the Double Irish. By 2010, US$95 billion of U.S. profits were shifted annually to Ireland, which increased to US$106 billion by  2015.  As the BEPS tool with which U.S. multinationals built up untaxed offshore reserves of circa US$1 trillion from 2004 to 2017, the Double Irish is the largest tax avoidance tool in history. In 2016, when the EU levied a €13 billion fine on Apple, the largest tax fine in history, it only covered the period 2004–14, during which Apple shielded €111 billion in profits from U.S (and Irish) tax.

The earliest recorded versions of the Double Irish-type BEPS tools are by Apple in the late 1980s, and the EU discovered Irish Revenue tax rulings on the Double Irish for Apple in 1991.  Irish state documents released to the Irish national archives in December 2018 showed that Fine Gael ministers in 1984 sought legal advice on how U.S. corporations could avoid taxes by operating from Ireland.  The former Irish Taoiseach, John Bruton, wrote to the then Finance Minister Alan Dukes saying: "In order to retain the maximum tax advantage, US corporations will wish to locate FSCs in a country where they will have to pay little or no tax. Therefore unless FSCs are given favourable tax treatment in Ireland, they will not locate here." Feargal O'Rourke, PwC tax partner in the IFSC (and son of Minister Mary O'Rourke, cousin of the 2008–2011 Irish Finance Minister Brian Lenihan Jnr) is regarded as its "grand architect".

Basic structure (no Dutch sandwich)

While there have been variations (e.g. Apple), the standard Double Irish arrangement, in simplified form, takes the following structure (note that the steps below initially exclude the Dutch sandwich component for simplicity, which is explained in the next section; Chart 1 includes the Dutch sandwich):

This structure has a problem. The pre–TCJA U.S. tax code allows foreign income to be left in foreign subsidiaries (deferring U.S. taxes), but it will consider BER1 to be a controlled foreign corporation (or "CFC"), sheltering income from a related party transaction (i.e. IRL1). It will apply full U.S. taxes to BER1 at 35%.

To get around this, the U.S. corporation needs to create a second Irish company (IRL2, or A), legally incorporated in Ireland (so under the U.S. tax code it is Irish), but which is "managed and controlled" from Bermuda (so under the Irish tax code it is from Bermuda). IRL2 will be placed between BER1 and IRL1 (i.e. owned by BER1, and owning IRL1). Up until the 2015 shut-down of the Double Irish, the Irish tax code was one of the few that allowed a company to be legally incorporated in its jurisdiction, but not be subject to its taxes (if managed and controlled elsewhere).

The U.S. corporation will "check-the-box" for IRL1 as it is clearly a foreign subsidiary selling to non–U.S. locations. The U.S. tax code will rightly ignore IRL1 from U.S. tax calculations. However, because the U.S. tax code also views IRL2 as foreign (i.e. Irish),  it also ignores the transactions between IRL1 and IRL2 (even though they are related parties). This is the essence of the Double Irish arrangement.

Note that in some explanations and diagrams BER1 is omitted (the Bermuda black hole); however, it is rare for a U.S. corporation to "own" IRL2 directly.

Elimination of Dutch sandwich (2010)

The Irish tax code historically levied a 20% withholding tax on transfers from an Irish company like IRL1, to companies in tax havens like BER1.  However, if IRL1 sends the money to a new Dutch company DUT1 (or S), via another royalty payment scheme, no Irish withholding tax is payable as Ireland does not levy withholding tax on transfers within EU states. In addition, under the Dutch tax code DUT1 can send money to IRL2 (an Irish company that is legally incorporated in Ireland, and thus the US-tax code regards it as foreign, but is "managed and controlled" from, say, Bermuda and thus the Irish tax code also regards it as foreign) under another royalty scheme without incurring Dutch withholding tax, as the Dutch do not charge withholding tax on royalty payment schemes.  This is called the dutch sandwich and DUT1 is described as the "dutch slice" (sitting between IRL1 and IRL2). Thus, with the addition of IRL2 and DUT1, we have the "Double Irish dutch sandwich" tax structure.

In 2010, the Irish government, on lobbying from PwC Ireland's IFSC tax partner, Feargal O'Rourke, relaxed the rules for sending royalty payments to non–EU countries without incurring Irish withholding tax (thus ending the dutch sandwich), but they are subject to conditions that will not suit all Double Irish arrangements.

Controversial closure (2015) 

The 2014–16 EU investigation into Apple in Ireland (see below), showed that the Double Irish existed as far back as 1991. Early U.S. academic research in 1994 into U.S. multinational use of tax havens identified profit shifting accounting techniques.  U.S. congressional investigations into the tax practices of U.S. multinationals were aware of such BEPS tools for many years.  However, the U.S. did not try to force the closure of the Double Irish BEPS tool, instead it was the EU which forced Ireland to close the Double Irish to new schemes in October 2014.  Nevertheless, existing users of the Double Irish BEPS tool (e.g. Apple, Google, Facebook, Microsoft, amongst many others), were given five more years until January 2020, before the tool would be fully shut-down to all users.

This approach by successive U.S. administrations is explained by an early insight that one of the most cited U.S. academic researchers into tax havens, and corporate taxation, James R. Hines Jr., had in 1994. Hines realised in 1994, that: "low foreign tax rates [from tax havens] ultimately enhance U.S. tax collections".  Hines would revisit this concept several times, as would others, and it would guide U.S. policy in this area for decades, including introducing the "check-the-box" rules in 1996, curtailing the 2000–10 OECD initiative on tax havens, and not signing the 2016 OECD anti-BEPS initiative.

By September 2018, tax academics proved U.S. multinationals were the largest users of BEPS tools, and that Ireland was the largest global BEPS hub.

In December 2018, Seamus Coffey, the Chairman of the Irish Fiscal Advisory Council, told The Times in relation to the closure of the Double Irish that "A lot of emphasis has been put on residency rules and I think that emphasis has been misplaced and the changes didn't have that much [of an] effect". On 3 January 2019, The Guardian reported that Google avoided corporate taxes on US$23 billion of profits in 2017 by using the Double Irish with the Dutch sandwich extension.

Apple's €13 billion EU fine (2016) 

By 2017, Apple was Ireland's largest company, and post leprechaun economics, accounted for over one quarter of Irish GDP growth.  Apple's use of the Double Irish BEPS tool to achieve tax rates <1%, dates back to the late 1980s, and was investigated by the U.S. Senate in May 2013, and covered in the main financial media.

On 29 August 2016 the European Commissioner for Competition concluded Apple had received illegal State aid from Ireland. The commission ordered Apple to pay €13 billion, plus interest, in unpaid Irish taxes on circa €111 billion of profits, for the ten-year period, 2004–2014.  It was the largest corporate tax fine in history.

Apple was not using the standard Double Irish arrangement of two Irish companies (IRL1 in Ireland, and IRL2 in Bermuda). Instead, Apple combined the functions of the two companies inside one Irish company (namely, Apple Sales International, or ASI), which was split into two internal "branches".  The Irish Revenue issued private rulings to Apple in 1991 and 2007 regarding this hybrid-double Irish structure, which the EU Commission considered as illegal State aid.

Single Malt

Concept and origin (2014)
In an October 2013 interview, PwC tax partner Feargal O'Rourke (see above), said that: "the days of the Double Irish tax scheme are numbered".

In October 2014, as the EU forced the Irish State to close the Double Irish BEPS tool, the influential U.S. National Tax Journal published an article by Jeffrey L Rubinger and Summer Lepree, showing that Irish based subsidiaries of U.S. corporations could replace the Double Irish arrangement with a new structure (now known as Single Malt). If the Bermuda–controlled Irish company (IRL2) was relocated to a country with whom (a) Ireland had a tax treaty, (b) with wording on "management and control" tax residency, and (c) had a zero corporate tax rate, then the Double Irish effect could be replicated. They highlighted Malta as a candidate. The Irish media picked up the article, but when an Irish MEP notified the then Finance Minister, Michael Noonan, he was told to "put on the green jersey".

Basic structure
The Single Malt is also an IP–based BEPS tool, and as a small variation of the Double Irish, required little additional development, except choosing specific locations with the necessary specific wording in their Irish bilateral tax treaties (e.g. Malta and the UAE); thus the basic structure is almost identical to the Double Irish with often a Maltese company replacing BER1 in the earlier example.

Discovery (2017)
A November 2017 report by Christian Aid, titled Impossible Structures, showed how quickly the Single Malt BEPS tool was replacing the Double Irish.  The report detailed Microsoft's (via LinkedIn), and Allergen's schemes and extracts from advisers to their clients.  The report also showed that Ireland was behaving like a "Captured State", and for example had opted out of Article 12 of the 2016 OECD anti-BEPS initiative to protect the Single Malt BEPS tool (it was also later pointed out in September 2018, that Malta had similarly opted out of Article 4 of the initiative to enable it to be the recipient of the Single Malt).  The then Irish Finance Minister Paschal Donohoe said that it would be investigated; however, questions were raised regarding the Irish State's policy of addressing corporate tax avoidance.

In September 2018, The Irish Times revealed that U.S. medical device manufacturer Teleflex, had created a new Single Malt scheme in July 2018, and had reduced their overall effective corporate tax rate to circa 3%.  The same article quoted a spokesman from the Department of Finance (Ireland) saying they had not as yet taken any action regarding the Single Malt BEPS tool, but they were keeping the matter, "under consideration".

Partial closure (2018)
In November 2018, the Irish Government amended the Ireland–Malta tax treaty to prevent the Single Malt BEPS tool being used between Ireland and Malta (it can still be used with the UAE for example); however, the exact closure date of the Irish Single Malt BEPS tool with Malta was deferred until September 2019.

On the same day that the closure was announced, The Irish Times reported that LinkedIn (Ireland), identified as a user of the Single Malt tool in 2017 (see above), had announced in filings that it had sold a major IP asset to its parent, Microsoft (Ireland).  Earlier in July 2018, Ireland's Sunday Business Post, disclosed that Microsoft (Ireland) were preparing a restructure of their Irish BEPS tools into a CAIA (or Green Jersey) Irish tax structure.

Rediscovery (2021)

In September 2021, The Irish Times reported that US pharmaceutical firm Abbott Laboratories was still using the Single Malt tool to shield profits on its COVID-19 testing kits.

Capital Allowances for Intangible Assets (CAIA)

Concept and origin (2009)
The Double Irish and Single Malt BEPS tools enable Ireland to act as a confidential "Conduit OFC" rerouting untaxed profits to places like Bermuda (e.g. it must be confidential as higher-tax locations would not sign full tax treaties with locations like Bermuda), the Capital Allowances for Intangible Assets ("CAIA") BEPS tool (also called the Green Jersey), enables Ireland to act as the terminus for the untaxed profits (e.g. Ireland becomes Bermuda, a "Sink OFC"). The CAIA uses the accepted tax concept of providing capital allowances for the purchase of assets.  However, Ireland turns it into a BEPS tool by providing the allowances for the purchase of intangible assets, and especially intellectual property assets, and critically, where the owner of the intangible assets is a "connected party" (e.g. a Group subsidiary).

For example, in Q1 2015, Apple used the CAIA tool when its Irish subsidiary purchased US$300 billion in intangible assets from an Apple subsidiary based in Jersey. The CAIA tool enabled Apple to write-off the US$300 billion price as a capital allowance against future Irish profits (e.g. the next US$300 billion of profits Apple books in Ireland are free of Irish tax). The CAIA capitalises the effect of the Double Irish or Single Malt BEPS tools, and behaves like a corporate tax inversion of a U.S. multinational's non–U.S. business. However, the CAIA is more powerful, as Apple demonstrated by effectively doubling the tax shield (e.g. to US$600 billion in allowances), via Irish interest relief on the intergroup virtual loans used to purchase the IP.  While Apple's CAIA had an ETR of 0%, some have an ETR of 2.5%.

In June 2009, the Irish State established the Commission on Taxation, to review Ireland's tax regime, and included Feargal O'Rourke, the "grand architect"  of the Double Irish tool. In September 2009, the commission recommended that the Irish State provide capital allowances for the acquisition of intangible assets, creating the CAIA BEPS tool.  The 2009 Finance Act, materially expanded the range of intangible assets attracting Irish capital allowances deductible against Irish taxable profits.  These "specified intangible assets" cover more esoteric intangibles such as types of general rights, general know-how, general goodwill, and the right to use software.  It includes types of "internally developed" group intangible assets and intangible assets purchased from "connected parties". The control is that the intangible assets must be acceptable under GAAP (older 2004 Irish GAAP is used), and auditable by an Irish IFSC accounting firm, like PwC or Ernst & Young.

In the 2010 Finance Act, on the recommendation of the Department of Finance's Tax Strategy Group, the CAIA BEPS tool was upgraded, reducing the amortisation and "clawback" period from 15 to 10 years, and expanding the range of intangible assets to include "a broader definition of know-how". In the 2011 and 2012 Finance Acts, the Tax Strategy Group made additional amendments to the rules regarding the acquisition of intangible assets from "connected parties", and the "employment tax" users of the CAIA BEPS tool must pay. The 2012 Finance Act removed the minimum amortisation period for the acquired intangible assets, and reduced the "clawback" to 5 years for CAIA schemes set up after February 2013.

The first known user of the CAIA BEPS tool was by Accenture, the first U.S. corporate tax inversion to Ireland in 2009.

By March 2017, Bloomberg would report that Ireland had become the most popular destination for U.S. corporate tax inversions in history, and would have the largest Medtronic (2015), 3rd-largest Johnson Controls (2016), 4th-largest Eaton Corporation (2012) and 6th-largest Perrigo (2013) U.S. corporate tax inversions in history.

Basic structure
The CAIA follows the first three steps of the Double Irish, and Single Malt, basic structure (see above, except in this case the example is not a per-unit example, but for the entire sales of a block of intellectual property), namely:

The CAIA and Double Irish (and Single Malt) share the same basic components and techniques (e.g. an intangible asset needs to be created and significantly re-valued in a tax haven). The key differences between the CAIA BEPS tool and the Double Irish (and Single Malt) BEPS tools are noted as follows:
 CAIA  capitalises the effect of the Double Irish in the Irish national accounts, leading to even greater ;
 While the ETR of the Double Irish is close to zero, the Irish State has from time-to-time capped the level of allowances under CAIA to 80%, giving an ETR of 2.5%;
 By providing the inter-group finance to purchase the intangible asset (step vi. above), the tax avoided by CAIA is almost twice that of the Double Irish;
 While the loophole behind the Double Irish has been closed, CAIA is a more established tax concept internationally, although only for tangible assets.

As with all Irish BEPS tools, the Irish subsidiary must conduct a "relevant trade" on the acquired IP.  A "business plan" must be produced with Irish employment and salary levels that are acceptable to the Irish State during the period capital allowances are claimed.  If the Irish subsidiary is wound up within 5 years, the CAIA intangible capital allowances are repayable, which is called "clawback".

Marketing of the CAIA BEPS tool

Irish BEPS tools are not overtly marketed as brochures showing near-zero effective tax rates ("ETR") would damage Ireland's ability to sign and operate bilateral tax treaties (i.e. higher-tax countries do not sign full treaties with known tax havens). However, in the Irish financial crisis, some Irish tax law firms in the IFSC produced CAIA brochures openly marketing that its ETR was 2.5%.

Apple's "leprechaun economics" (2015)

The EU Commission's 30 August 2016 findings against Apple's hybrid–Double Irish BEPS tool, Apple Sales International ("ASI"), covered the period from 2004 to end 2014 (see above). The EU's August 2016 report on Apple, notes that Apple had informed the commission at the start of 2015 that they had closed their hybrid–Double Irish BEPS tool. In January 2018, Irish economist Seamus Coffey, Chairman of the State's Irish Fiscal Advisory Council, and author of the State's 2017 Review of Ireland's Corporation Tax Code, showed Apple restructured ASI into the CAIA BEPS tool in Q1 2015.

During Q1 2018, Coffey, and international economists, proved Ireland's 2015 "leprechaun economics" GDP growth of 33.4%, was attributable to Apple's new CAIA BEPS tool. Coffey noted the significance of Apple's endorsement of the CAIA BEPS tool, given Apple's status as one of the longest users of the Double Irish BEPS tool, and one of the largest users of BEPS tools worldwide.

In January 2018, there was further controversy over Apple's CAIA BEPS tool when Coffey pointed out that it is prohibited under Ireland's tax code (Section 291A(c) of the Taxes and Consolation Act 1997), to use the CAIA BEPS tool for reasons that are not "commercial bona fide reasons", and in schemes where the main purpose is "the avoidance of, or reduction in, liability to tax". In addition, it was realised in hindsight, that changes former Finance Minister Michael Noonan made in the Irish 2015 Finance Budget, was to ensure the ETR of Apple's CAIA tool was reduced to zero.

In June 2018, Apple's post Q1 2015 BEPS tax structure in Ireland was labelled "the Green Jersey" by the EU Parliament's GUE–NGL body and described in detail.

Microsoft's Green Jersey (2018)
In December 2017, the Irish Government accepted the recommendation of Coffey that corporation tax relief for the Irish CAIA BEPS tool be capped at 80% for new arrangements, to restore the CAIA's effective Irish corporate tax rate ("ETR") back to 2.5%.  This was enacted in the 2017 Finance Budget, but only for new CAIA BEPS schemes (e.g. Apple's 2015 CAIA scheme would not be affected). Given the dramatic take-up in the CAIA tool in 2015, when the cap lifted (e.g. the ETR was 0%), Irish commentators challenged Coffey's recommendation. He responded in a paper in late 2017.

In July 2018, it was reported that Microsoft was preparing to execute another "Green Jersey" CAIA BEPS transaction. which, due to technical issues with the TCJA, makes the CAIA BEPS tool attractive to U.S. multinationals. In July 2018, Coffey posted that Ireland could see a "boom" in the onshoring of U.S. IP, via the CAIA BEPS tool, between now and 2020, when the Double Irish is fully closed.  In May 2019, it was reported Microsoft moved $52.8bn of IP assets to Ireland. In January 2020, The Irish Times speculated that Google Inc., was also considering using the CAIA BEPS tool.

Effect of BEPS tools on Ireland's economy

In June 2018, academic tax researcher Gabriel Zucman (et alia) estimated Ireland was the world's largest BEPS hub, and also the world's largest tax haven.  In September 2018, Zucman and Wright showed that US corporates were the largest users of BEPS tools, representing almost half of all BEPS activity.  The concentration of BEPS activity impacted Ireland's economy in a number of ways:

Distortion of Irish GDP/GNP

An "artificially inflated GDP-per-capita statistic", is a feature of tax havens, due to the BEPS flows.  In February 2017, Ireland's national accounts became so distorted by BEPS flows that the Central Bank of Ireland replaced Irish GDP and Irish GNP with a new economic measure, Irish Modified GNI*.  However, in December 2017, Eurostat reported that Modified GNI* did not remove all of the distortions from Irish economic data.  By September 2018, the Irish Central Statistics Office ("CSO") reported that Irish GDP was 162% of Irish GNI* (e.g. BEPS tools artificially inflated Ireland's GDP by 62%).  In contrast EU–28 2017 GDP was 100% of GNI. Irish public indebtedness changes dramatically depending on whether Debt-to-GDP, Debt-to-GNI* or Debt-per-Capita is used (Per-Capita removes all BEPS tool distortion).

Concentration of US multinationals

Tax academics show multinationals from countries with "territorial" tax systems make little use of tax havens like Ireland.  Since the UK changed its tax regime to a "territorial" system in 2009–12, Ireland has failed to attract corporates from any other jurisdiction except the US, one of the last "worldwide" tax systems.  By September 2018, US–controlled corporates were 25 of Ireland's 50 largest companies, paid 80% of Irish business taxes, and directly employed 25% of the Irish labour force, and created 57% of Irish value-add.  The past president of the Irish Tax Institute stated they pay 50% of all Irish salary taxes (due to higher paying jobs), 50% of all Irish VAT, and 92% of all Irish customs and excise duties.  The American-Ireland Chamber of Commerce estimated the value of US investment in Ireland in 2018 was €334 billion, exceeding Irish GDP (€291 billion in 2016), and exceeding the combined investment of US investment in the BRIC countries.  The US multinational subsidiaries in Ireland, are not simply used for booking EU sales, in most cases, they handle the entire non–US business of the Group.  Apart from US corporates, and legacy UK corporates (pre 2009–12), there are no foreign corporates in Ireland's top 50 firms. Academics say Ireland is more accurately described as a "US corporate tax haven", and a shield for non–US profits from the historic US "worldwide" tax system.

Disagreement on Irish ETRs

One of the most contested aspects of Ireland's economy is the aggregate "effective tax rate" (ETR) of Ireland's corporate tax regime. The Irish State refutes tax haven labels as unfair criticism of its low, but legitimate, 12.5% Irish corporate tax rate, which it defends as being the effective tax rate ("ETR").  Independent studies show that Ireland's aggregate effective corporate tax rate is between 2.2% to 4.5% (depending on assumptions made).  This lower aggregate effective tax rate is consistent with the individual effective tax rates of US multinationals in Ireland, as well as the IP-based BEPS tools openly marketed by the main Irish tax-law firms, in the IFSC, with ETRs of 0–2.5% (see "effective tax rate").

Effect of the Tax Cuts and Jobs Act (TCJA)

US corporate tax haven (to 2017)

In June 2018, tax academics showed that Ireland had become the world's largest global BEPS hub, or corporate-focused tax haven.  In September 2018, tax academics showed that US multinationals were the largest users of BEPS tools.  In 2016, leading tax academic James R. Hines Jr., showed that multinationals from "territorial" tax systems, the system used by almost all global economies bar a handful but which included the US, make little use of tax havens.  Hines, and others, had previously quoted the example of the U.K., who transitioned from a "worldwide" system to a "territorial" system in 2009–2012, which led to a reversal of many UK inversions to Ireland, and turned the U.K. into one of the leading destinations for U.S. corporate tax inversions (although Ireland is still the most popular).  A similar case study was cited in the switch by Japan in 2009 from a full US "worldwide" tax system (e.g. very high domestic tax rate, partially mitigated by a controlled foreign corporation regime), to a full "territorial" tax system, with positive results.

Academics point to these facts as the explanation for the extraordinary  in Ireland's economy, and the equal failure of Ireland to attract non-U.S. multinationals or any multinationals from "territorial" tax systems. While Ireland sometimes describes itself as a "global knowledge hub for selling into Europe", it is more accurately described as a U.S. corporate tax haven for shielding non-U.S. revenues from the historical U.S. "worldwide" tax system.

U.S. change to a territorial system (post 2017)
In December 2017, the U.S. Tax Cuts and Jobs Act ("TCJA"), the U.S. changed from a "worldwide" tax system to a hybrid–"territorial" tax system, to encourage U.S. multinationals to relocate functions back from tax havens.  In addition, the US, as the UK had done in 2009–12, aimed to become a favoured destination for foreign multinational to relocate.  In their October 2017 report on the proposed TCJA legalisation, the U.S. Council of Economic Advisors, quoted Hines' work on tax havens, and used Hines' calculations, to estimate the quantum of U.S. investment that should return as a result of the TCJA.

As well as switching to a hybrid–"territorial" tax system, the TCJA contains a unique "carrot" and a "stick" aimed at U.S. multinationals in Ireland:

In March–April 2018, major U.S. tax law firms showed that pre the TCJA, U.S. multinationals with the IP needed to use Irish BEPS tools, would achieve effective Irish tax rates ("ETR") of 0–2.5% versus 35% under the historical U.S. system. However, post the TCJA, these multinationals can use their IP to achieve U.S. ETRs, which net of the TCJA's 100% capital relief provisions, are similar to the ETRs they would achieve in Ireland when the TCJA's new GILTI provisions are taken into account (e.g. ETR of circa 11–12%).  In Q1 2018, U.S. multinationals like Pfizer announced in Q1 2018, a post-TCJA global tax rate for 2019 of circa 17%, which is close to the circa 15–16% 2019 tax rate announced by past U.S. corporate tax inversions to Ireland, Eaton, Allergan, and Medtronic.

Early implications for Ireland (2018)
As the TCJA was being passed in December 2017, the new corporate tax provisions were recognised by the Irish media, as a challenge.  Donald Trump had "singled out" Ireland in 2017 speeches promoting the TCJA, and Trump administration economic advisor, Stephen Moore, predicted "a flood of companies" would leave Ireland due to the TCJA.  Leading U.S. tax academic, Mihir A. Desai in a post–TCJA 26 December 2017 interview in the Harvard Business Review said that: "So, if you think about a lot of technology companies that are housed in Ireland and have massive operations there, they're not going to maybe need those in the same way, and those can be relocated back to the U.S.

In December 2017, U.S technology firm Vantiv, the world's largest payment processing company, confirmed that it had abandoned its plan to execute a corporate tax inversion to Ireland.  In March 2018, the Head of Life Sciences in Goldman Sachs, Jami Rubin, stated that: "Now that [U.S.] corporate tax reform has passed, the advantages of being an inverted company are less obvious".  In August 2018, U.S. multinational Afilias, who had been headquartered in Ireland since 2001, announced that as a result of the TCJA, it was moving back to the U.S.

However, in contrast, it was reported in May–July 2018, that U.S. tax academics and tax economists were discovering material technical flaws in the TCJA that incentivise the U.S. use of tax havens like Ireland. Of particular note was the exclusion from the GILTI tax of the first 10% of profits on overseas tangible assets, which incentivises investment in tangible assets abroad.  However, a more serious concern, was the acceptance of capital allowances, both tangible and intangible, as deductible against GILTI taxation, which would enable U.S. users of the CAIA BEPS tool to convert their Irish ETR of 0–2.5%, into a final U.S. ETR of 0–2.5%.  In May–July 2018, Google and Facebook announced large expansions of their Dublin office campuses in Ireland.

A June 2018 IMF country report on Ireland, while noting the significant exposure of Ireland's economy to U.S. corporates, concluded that the TCJA may not be as effective as Washington expects in addressing Ireland as a U.S. corporate tax haven. In writing its report, the IMF conducted confidential anonymous interviews with Irish corporate tax experts.  In July 2018, it was reported that Microsoft was preparing to execute Apple's "Green Jersey" CAIA BEPS transaction.  In July 2018, Seamus Coffey, Chairperson of the Irish Fiscal Advisory Council and author of the Irish State's 2016 review of the Irish corporate tax code,  posted that Ireland could see a "boom" in the onshoring of U.S. IP, via the CAIA BEPS tool, between now and 2020, when the Double Irish is fully closed.

In February 2019, Brad Setser from the Council on Foreign Relations wrote a New York Times article highlighting material issues with TCJA in terms of combatting tax havens.

Multinationals that used Irish BEPS tools
This is not a comprehensive list as many US multinationals in Ireland use "unlimited liability companies" (ULCs), which do not file public accounts with the Irish CRO.

Double Irish
Major companies in Ireland known to employ the Double Irish BEPS tool, include:

Single malt
Major companies in Ireland known to employ the single-malt BEPS tool, include:
 Microsoft (LinkedIn), using Malta
 Allergan (Zeitiq), using Malta
 Teleflex, using Malta
 Abbot Laboratories, using Malta

Capital allowances for intangible assets
Major companies in Ireland known to employ the capital-allowances for intangible assets ("CAIA") BEPS tool, include:
 Apple Inc., started in 2015 with the leprechaun economics affair
 Accenture, started in 2009

See also

 Criticism of Google
 Criticism of Apple Inc.
 Criticism of Facebook
 Taxation in the Republic of Ireland
 Corporation tax in the Republic of Ireland
 EU illegal State aid case against Apple in Ireland
 Corporate tax haven
 Tax haven
 Leprechaun economics Apple BEPS tool in Ireland
 Modified gross national income replaced Irish GDP/GNP
 Green jersey agenda
 Feargal O'Rourke architect of Ireland's BEPS tools
 Matheson (law firm) Ireland's largest U.S. tax advisor
 Qualifying investor alternative investment fund (QIAIF) Irish tax-free vehicles
 Section 110 SPV debt-based BEPS tool
 Conduit and Sink OFCs analysis of tax havens
 Ireland as a tax haven
 Panama as a tax haven
 United States as a tax haven
 James R. Hines Jr., leader in academic research on tax havens
 Dhammika Dharmapala, leader in academic research on tax havens
 Gabriel Zucman, leader in academic research on tax havens

Notes

References

External links 
 
An illustration of the "Double Irish Dutch Sandwich". Australian Broadcasting Corporation.

International taxation
Taxation in the Republic of Ireland
Corporate tax avoidance
Corporate taxation in the United States
Economy of the Republic of Ireland